The Greening Earth Society, now defunct, was a public relations organization which denied the effects of climate change and the impacts of increased levels of carbon dioxide.  The Society published the World Climate Report, a newsletter edited by Patrick Michaels of the Cato Institute.

It was a non-profit organization created by the Western Fuels Association, with which it shared an office and many staff members. It has been called a "front group created by the coal industry" and an "industry front". Fred Palmer, a Society staffer, is a registered lobbyist for Peabody Energy, a coal company.

Although the Greening Earth Society generally rejected the science of climate change, it acknowledged some degree of global warming as real: "Fact #1. The rate of global warming during the past several decades has been about 0.18°C per decade".  Note that the actual increase in the global surface temperature during the 100 years ending in 2005 was 0.74 ± 0.18 °C.

References

External links
 https://web.archive.org/web/*/http://www.greeningearthsociety.org

Climate change denial
Defunct climate change organizations
Organizations of environmentalism skeptics and critics
Political organizations based in the United States
Year of establishment missing